Joel Habener is a Professor of Medicine at Harvard Medical School who has done fundamental studies on elucidating the role of incretin hormones such as Glucagon-like peptide-1 (GLP-1) and Glucagon-like peptide-2 (GLP-2). For his discoveries, he was awarded the 2020 Warren Alpert Foundation Prize along with Daniel Drucker and Jens Juul Holst. He was elected to the National Academy of Sciences in 2020. In 2021 he was awarded the Canada Gairdner International Award.

References

Harvard Medical School staff
Medical researchers
Members of the United States National Academy of Sciences
Living people
Year of birth missing (living people)